Nazrul Islam Khan is a Bangladeshi politician.  He is currently a member of the Bangladesh National Party's National Standing Committee. He was BNP's polls coordination committee chief for the 2018 Bangladeshi general election.

Biography
Khan was an active worker of the labor movement in the 1970s. In 1970, he was the president of the Pakistan Machine Tools Factory (present Bangladesh Machine Tools Factory).

On the eve of the liberation war of Bangladesh, when the All-party Alliance Council was formed in Joydebpur of Gazipur in March 1971, Khan was appointed as Treasurer.

Khan was the founding General Secretary of Bangladesh Jatyatabadi Sramik Dal in 1979.

Khan is a former President of Bangladesh Jatiyabadi Sramik Dal, serving in 2003.

In 2004, Khan was appointed ambassador of Bangladesh to Kuwait.

References

Living people
Bangladesh Nationalist Party politicians
Ambassadors of Bangladesh to Kuwait
Bangladeshi trade unionists
1948 births